Apatetris elaeagnella is a moth of the family Gelechiidae. It was described by Sakamaki in 2000. It is found in Japan (Honshu and Kyushu).

The wingspan is 5.4–9.2 mm. The forewings are cupreous black, but shining cupreous violet between the plica and dorsum and silver on the basal one-seventh. There are three costal silver strigulae running in parallel with each other on the median one-third. Three similar strigulae are found in the basal half of the dorsum and a silver blotch occupies the apical one-eighths of the forewing. There are also two white blotches, one at the apical one-fourth of the costa and the other at the apical two-fifths of the dorsum. The hindwings are fuscous. There are two generations per year.

The larvae feed on Elaeagnus macrophylla, Elaeagnus multiflora var. hortensis, Elaeagnus umbellata and Elaeagnus pungens. They mine the leaves of their host plant. Larvae of the autumn generation overwinter within the mine.

References

Moths described in 2000
Apatetris
Moths of Japan